Church of Holy Trinity was a Serbian Orthodox Church located in the village of Petrič, municipality of Peja, in Kosovo. It was built in 1992 as a donation of the Karić family. The destruction of the church happened shortly after the arrival of the Italian KFOR troops. During the humanitarian tragedy of the Kosovo War, the church was vandalized and completely destroyed in June 1999 by Albanians.

External links
 The list of destroyed and desecrated churches in Kosovo and Metohija, June-October 1999 (Списак уништених и оскрнављених цркава на Косову и Метохији јун-октобар 1999)

References

Religious buildings and structures in Peja
Cultural heritage of Kosovo
Serbian Orthodox church buildings in Kosovo
Destroyed churches in Kosovo
Former Serbian Orthodox churches
20th-century Serbian Orthodox church buildings
1992 establishments in Kosovo
Churches completed in 1992
1999 disestablishments in Kosovo
Buildings and structures demolished in 1999